Sectorul Rîșcani (also spelled Râșcani) is one of the five sectors in Chișinău, the capital of Moldova. The local administration is managed by a pretor appointed by the city administration. It governs over a portion of the city of Chișinău itself (the northeastern part), the town of Cricova, and the communes of Ciorescu, Grătiești, and Stăuceni. It has a sizable population of Russians and Ukrainians. To distinguish it from the city of Rîșcani elsewhere in Moldova it is often referred to as Rîșcanovca by locals. Rîșcani's main street is Strada Moscova. There are several parks including a park dedicated to the Soviet victims of the Afghanistan war in 1989. 

The main trolleybus lines which serve Rîșcani are no. 24 and no.13, there are a number of minibuses which stop regularly along Str. Moscova and other points in the city. There is a large park near to the Afghanistan memorial park containing a large lake and woodland. Rîșcani is somewhat separated from the rest of Chișinău by a bridge. One notable building (now disused) in Rîșcani is the old state circus which has now fallen into disrepair. 

Riscani is represented every year by dancers and stallholders during the Day of Chișinău. 

Sectors of Chișinău